High＆Low The DTC is a Japanese comedy streaming television miniseries. It is a spin-off of the High&Low series, setting roughly after the story of High&Low The Movie, focusing on the casual and pleasant life of Sannoh Rengokai (Hoodlum Squad)'s member Dan, Tettsu, and Chiharu, who called themselves DTC. It was released on the streaming service Hulu in three parts, and the first three episodes were released on August 11, 2017.

High＆Low The DTC is directed by Norihisa Hiranuma, with starred by Kenjiro Yamashita, Kanta Sato, Taiki Sato starring as Dan, Tettsu and Chiharu, respectively. The series served as a heat-up for the upcoming High&Low film, High&Low The Movie 2 / End of Sky, while broadening the world of High&Low by emphasizing its comedy side.

Synopsis 
At Sannoh Rengokai (Hoodlum Squad)'s hang out place, diner Itokan, Dan, Tettsu, and Chiharu put on a comedy.

Cast and characters 

 Kenjiro Yamashita as Dan, a member of Sannoh Rengokai (Hoodlum Squad) and the "D" of DTC. Talking in Kansai dialect, he is a mood maker and is some the leader of DTC. He runs his family shop  "Dan Shoten".
 Kanta Sato as Tettsu, a member of Sannoh Rengokai (Hoodlum Squad) and the "T" of DTC.  He dreams of becoming a Youtuber and attracts the attention of girls.
 Taiki Sato as Chiharu, a member of Sannoh Rengokai (Hoodlum Squad) and the "C" DTC. After he joins Sannoh Rengokai (Hoodlum Squad), he quickly becomes friends with Dan and Tettsu.
 Shuuka Fujii as Naomi, who runs the diner "Itokan". She has a bitter tongue towards those boys, but she always treats their wounds gently.
 Nozomi Bando as Nika Ijuin, who does part-time jobs at diner "Itokan". She is sweet to DTC.

Masayasu Yagi plays Kabuto Ijuin, the so-called "Crabman ", and Kousei Amano plays Ozawa, who wants to be popular around girls more than anything. The two form the duet "Vertical Flute Brothers" . Takanori Iwata appears as Cobra, Keiji Kuroki appears as Rocky, Yuki Yamada appears as Yoshiki Murayama, Masataka Kubota appears as Smoky, Kento Hayashi appears as Norihisa Hyuga, they are the leaders of the SWORD gangs. Kaede plays Shiba, Harumi Sato plays Oshiage, Nonoka Yamaguchi plays Nonoriki, Airi Kido plays Ishikawa, they are members of the female gang Ichigo Milk. Keita Machida appears as Sannoh Rengokai (Hoodlum Squad)'s member Noboru.

Fumihiko Tachiki serves as the narrator of the series.

Episodes

Release 
High＆Low The DTC was released on the streaming service Hulu in three parts, with Episode 1,2,3 released on August 11, 2017,  Episode 4,5,6,7 released on August 18, 2017,  Episode 8,9,10,11 released on August 25, 2017.☃☃

In 2018, to celebrate the release of DTC -Yukemuri Junjou Hen- from High&Low, it was released on YouTube for free for a limited period. From July 20, 2018, to September 30, each episode became available on YouTube for 2 days.

References 

2017 Japanese television series debuts
2010s comedy television series
2017 Japanese television series endings
Japanese comedy television series
Japanese-language television shows
Hulu original programming